The men's Star was a sailing event on the sailing at the 2008 Summer Olympics program in Qingdao International Sailing Centre. Eleven races (last one a medal race) were scheduled and completed. 32 sailors, on 16 boats, from 16 nations competed. Ten boats qualified for the medal race.

Race schedule
Sources:

Course areas and course configurations 
Source: 

For the Star course areas A  (Yellow) and E  (Pink) were used. The location (36°1'26"’N, 120°26'52"E) points to the center of the 0.6nm radius Yellow course area and the location (36°2'44"N, 120°28'9"E) points to the center of the 0.75nm radius Pink course area. The target time for the course was about 60 minutes for the races and 30 minutes for the medal race. The race management could choose from several course configurations.

Outer courses 
 O1: Start – 1 – 2 – 3s/3p – 2 – 3p – Finish
 O2: Start – 1 – 2 – 3s/3p – 2 – 3s/3p – 2 – 3p – Finish
 O3: Start – 1 – 2 – 3s/3p – 2 – 3s/3p – 2 – 3s/3p – 2 – 3p – Finish

Inner courses 
 I1: Start – 1 – 4s/4p – 1 – 2 – 3p – Finish
 I2: Start – 1 – 4s/4p – 1 – 4s/4p – 1 – 2 – 3p – Finish
 I3: Start – 1 – 4s/4p – 1 – 4s/4p – 1 – 4s/4p – 1 – 2 – 3p – Finish

Windward-leeward courses 
 W2: Start – 1 – 4s/4p – 1 – Finish
 W3: Start – 1 – 4s/4p – 1 – 4s/4p – 1 – Finish
 W4: Start – 1 – 4s/4p – 1 – 4s/4p – 1 – 4s/4p – 1 – Finish

Weather conditions 
In the lead up to the Olympics many questioned the choice of Qingdao as a venue with very little predicted wind. During the races the wind was pretty light and quite unpredictable. For the Star competition several races had to be postponed to the next day and the spare day had to be used.

Final results 
Sources:

Daily standings

Further reading

References 

Men's Star
Star (keelboat) competitions
Men's events at the 2008 Summer Olympics